Little Children is a 2006 American romantic psychological drama film directed by Todd Field. It is based on the 2004 novel of the same name by Tom Perrotta, who co-wrote the screenplay with Field. It follows Sarah Pierce (Kate Winslet), an unhappy housewife who has an affair with a married neighbor (Patrick Wilson). Also starring are Jennifer Connelly, Jackie Earle Haley, Noah Emmerich, Gregg Edelman, Phyllis Somerville and Will Lyman.

Little Children premiered at the 44th New York Film Festival, and was released October 6, 2006 on 5 screens, earning $145,946, with a $29,189 per-screen average. However, during its 64 weeks in theaters, 32 screens were the most on which New Line Cinema ever exhibited the film, only briefly increasing that count to 109 in the few weeks leading up to the 79th Academy Awards. Consequently, few cinema-goers had access to it, significantly limiting its earnings. Despite this, it won numerous critics' group prizes and received Oscar nominations for Best Actress for Winslet, Best Supporting Actor for Haley, and Best Adapted Screenplay for Field and Perrotta.

Plot
Sarah Pierce lives with her husband Richard and daughter Lucy. Their marriage falls apart, however, when she discovers his addiction to internet pornography. One day, she meets Brad Adamson, a law student who brings his 4-year-old son, Aaron, to the park. Brad and Sarah become friendly and, on a dare, kiss in the park. They are instantly attracted to each other, but resolve to keep their relationship platonic.

One day, several parents panic when they see sex offender Ronnie J. McGorvey, who was recently released from prison, swimming in the pool with the children. After he is escorted away by the police, Sarah and Brad take Lucy and Aaron back to her house and put the kids to bed. While Sarah is drying towels in her basement, Brad comes down and they have sex.

Ronnie lives with his mother, May, who believes that meeting a woman his own age would cure him of his pedophilia. Ronnie, reluctantly, agrees to go on a date May has arranged for him with a woman named Sheila, which ends badly when he masturbates next to her in the car by a children's playground.

When Brad skips taking the bar exam again, his wife Kathy grows suspicious and tells Brad to invite Sarah, Richard, and Lucy over for dinner. The intimacy evident between Brad and Sarah confirms her suspicions, and Kathy arranges for her mother to come for an extended visit. When Brad's football team plays its final game, Sarah attends and cheers as Brad scores the winning touchdown. Afterwards, they make out on the field, with Brad convincing her to run away with him.

Larry Hedges, Brad's friend and a former police officer, spends much of his time harassing Ronnie. One night, he enters Ronnie's neighborhood with a megaphone. May comes out to confront him, suffering a heart attack in the process when Larry pushes her to the ground, causing him to be arrested. May is taken to a hospital, where she dies. When Ronnie returns home from the hospital, he finds a letter written by May saying: "Please be a good boy." Distraught, Ronnie destroys much of his mother's collection of Hummel figurines before grabbing a knife.

That same night, Sarah and Brad agree to meet in the park. As he heads to the park, he is distracted by skateboarding teenagers. Attempting to try a jump himself, he knocks himself out. When he regains consciousness, he asks the paramedics to call his wife to meet him at the hospital.

When Sarah takes Lucy to the park, she sees Ronnie stagger onto one of the swings, revealing to her that his mother died. When Lucy disappears, Sarah panics and rushes to find her, forgetting about Brad. She finds her staring at a street lamp and places her back into her car. Larry arrives to apologize to Ronnie about May, but when he discovers that Ronnie has castrated himself and is bleeding to death, he races him to the hospital, the same time as Kathy meets Brad there.

Cast

Production

For this film, director Todd Field and novelist Tom Perrotta intended to take the story in a separate and somewhat different direction than the novel. "When Todd and I began collaborating on the script, we were hoping to make something new out of the material, rather than simply reproducing the book onto film," says Perrotta.

Kate Winslet said she was left with a bruised bottom after filming her sex scene in a sink.

Critical reception

The film was well-received. On review aggregator Rotten Tomatoes, the film holds a 80% approval rating based on 162 reviews, with an average rating of 7.40/10. The website's critical consensus states, "Little Children takes a penetrating look at suburbia and its flawed individuals with an unflinching yet humane eye.” Metacritic assigned the film a weighted average score of 75 out of 100 based on 34 critics, indicating "generally favorable reviews.”

A. O. Scott of The New York Times wrote:

Scott later placed Little Children ninth on his list of the top 10 films of 2006.

Carina Chocano of The Los Angeles Times also praised the film:

Awards and honors

The film received multiple awards and accolades, including three Academy Award nominations: Best Actress for Kate Winslet, Best Supporting Actor for Jackie Earle Haley, and Best Adapted Screenplay for Todd Field and Tom Perrotta.

Top ten lists
Little Children was listed on many critics' top ten lists.

 1st – Kevin Crust, Los Angeles Times
 2nd – Mick LaSalle, San Francisco Chronicle
 3rd – Michael Phillips, Chicago Tribune
 3rd – Dennis Harvey, Variety
 4th – James Berardinelli, Reelviews
 4th – J.R. Jones, Chicago Reader
 5th – Peter Hartlaub, San Francisco Chronicle
 6th – Frank Scheck, The Hollywood Reporter
 8th – Shawn Levy, Portland Oregonian
 9th – A.O. Scott, New York Times
 10th – William Arnold, Seattle Post-Intelligencer
 10th – Richard Schickel, Time
 Top 10 (listed alphabetically) – Carina Chocano, Los Angeles Times
 Top 10 (listed alphabetically) – Ruthe Stein, San Francisco Chronicle
 Top 10 (listed alphabetically) – Steven Rea, Philadelphia Inquirer
 Best of 2006 (listed alphabetically, not ranked) – David Denby, The New Yorker

Film archives
35mm safety prints are housed in both the UCLA Film & Television Archive and the Museum of Modern Art's permanent film collection.

Home media

The film was released on DVD on May 1, 2007. The DVD does not include extra features or a director's commentary.

References

External links

 
 
 
 

2000s psychological drama films
2006 films
2006 romantic drama films
American football films
American independent films
American psychological drama films
American romantic drama films
Films about adultery in the United States
Films about pedophilia
Films based on American novels
Adultery in films
Films directed by Todd Field
Films scored by Thomas Newman
Films set in Massachusetts
Films shot in Maine
Films shot in New Jersey
Films shot in New York (state)
Films shot in Rhode Island
Films about mother–daughter relationships
Films about mother–son relationships
New Line Cinema films
2000s English-language films
2000s American films